David Lancaster is an American film and television producer and the CEO of the production company Rumble Films. His work as a producer for the 2014 film Whiplash earned him a nomination for Best Picture at the 87th Academy Awards.

Life and career 
Lancaster began his career as a film producer in 1985 for the television film The Laundromat. His first feature film was Two Idiots in Hollywood (1988), which was directed by Stephen Tobolowsky. More films and television films as producer and executive producer followed, with Lancaster eventually becoming co-president of the production company Bold Films in 2006.

In 2014, he resigned his position at Bold Films to launch his own film company, Rumble Films. His work on the 2014 film Whiplash earned him and fellow producers Jason Blum and Helen Estabrook a nomination for Best Picture at the 87th Academy Awards.

Filmography

Film

Television

References

External links
 

Living people
American film producers
American television producers
Year of birth missing (living people)